Dorothy Appleby (January 6, 1906 – August 9, 1990) was an American film actress. She appeared in over 50 films between 1931 and 1943.

Career
Appleby gained early acting experience as an understudy and a chorus member in plays in New York City. A newspaper article reported that Appleby "came to New York fresh from winning a Maine beauty contest."

Appleby was seen in many supporting roles, almost always in short subjects or low-budget feature films. The trim brunette stood just over five feet tall, and her early leading men (like comedian Charley Chase) towered over her.

She soon found steady if not prestigious work in Columbia Pictures' two-reel comedies. She appeared frequently with The Three Stooges. She worked with Columbia comics Andy Clyde, El Brendel, and Hugh Herbert, and she had an uncredited part in John Ford's Stagecoach.

Some of her Stooge comedies were Loco Boy Makes Good, So Long Mr. Chumps, and In the Sweet Pie and Pie. One memorable appearance was as Mexican brunette Rosita in 1940's Cookoo Cavaliers. In the film, Appleby gets clobbered by the Stooges when a facial "mud pack" made of concrete dries on her face. Her petite figure belied her age, and she continued to play "younger" roles into the 1940s. One of her last screen roles was a one-line bit (playing a college co-ed at age 35) in the 1941 Jane Withers feature Small Town Deb.

Personal Life and Death
In October 1925, newspapers reported that Appleby had married Teddy Hayes, an athletic trainer. Days later, however, Appleby contradicted that report. "Honest Injun, I'm single," she said. "Didn't mean it when I said I was married to Teddy Hayes." On May 11, 1932, she was granted a divorce from actor Morgan H. Galloway. She left Hollywood in 1943 and married musician Paul Drake soon thereafter. The two divorced in 1980. 

Dorothy Appleby died in Hicksville, New York, on August 9, 1990, aged 84.

Partial filmography

 Paradise for Two (1927) - Young girl (uncredited)
 New York (1927) - Young girl (uncredited)
 Square Crooks (1928) - Kay Ellison
 Under Eighteen (1931) - Elsie
 Trick for Trick (1933) - Maisie Henry
 King of the Wild Horses (1933) - Napeeta
 The Prizefighter and the Lady (1933) - Woman in Bar (uncredited)
 As the Earth Turns (1934) - Doris
 Jail Birds of Paradise (1934, Short) - Miss Deering - Prison Warder
 School for Girls (1934) - Florence Burns
 I Give My Love (1934) - Alice Henley
 Two Heads on a Pillow (1934) - Mitzie LaVerne
 Fate's Fathead (1934, Short) - Dorothy Chase
 Charlie Chan in Paris (1935) - Nardi
 Let 'Em Have It (1935) - Lola
 Riffraff (1936) - Gertie
 Lady of Secrets (1936) - Erma (uncredited)
 North of Nome (1936) - Ruby
 Paradise Express (1937) - Kay Carson
 Sea Racketeers (1937) - Dancer (uncredited)
 Make a Wish (1937) - Telephone Girl
 Fit for a King (1937) - Waitress (uncredited)
 Small Town Boy (1937) - Sandra French
 Live, Love and Learn (1937) - Lou - Bob's Model (uncredited)
 Making the Headlines (1938) - Claire Sandford
 Stagecoach (1939) - Girl in Saloon (uncredited)
 The Flying Irishman (1939) - Maybelle - a Waitress (uncredited)
 When Tomorrow Comes (1939) - Waitress (uncredited)
 The Women (1939) - Treatment Girl (uncredited)
 Nothing But Pleasure (1940, Short) - Mrs. Plunkett
 Convicted Woman (1940) - Daisy
 Rockin' Thru the Rockies (1940, Short) - Tessie
 Pardon My Berth Marks (1940, Short) - Mary Christman
 The Doctor Takes a Wife (1940) - Woman in Book Store (uncredited)
 Gold Rush Maisie (1940) - Hatcheck Girl (uncredited)
 From Nurse to Worse (1940, Short) - Dr. Lerious' Receptionist (uncredited)
 The Taming of the Snood (1940, Short) - Miss Wilson
 The Spook Speaks (1940, Short) - Newlywed Wife
 The Devil's Pipeline (1940) - Stewardess
 Cookoo Cavaliers (1940, Short) - Rosita (uncredited)
 High Sierra (1941) - Margie - Joe's Girlfriend (uncredited)
 So Long Mr. Chumps (1941, Short) - Pomeroy's Girlfriend (uncredited)
 Manpower (1941) - Wilma
 In the Sweet Pie and Pie (1941, Short) - Tiska Jones
 General Nuisance (1941, Short) - Army nurse Dorothy
 His Ex Marks the Spot (1941, Short) - Buster's second wife
 Loco Boy Makes Good (1942, Short) - Twitchell's Girl
 What's the Matador? (1942, Short) - O'Brien's Secretary
 Small Town Deb (1942) - Tim's dancing partner (uncredited)

References

External links

Dorothy Appleby at threestooges.net

1906 births
1990 deaths
American film actresses
20th-century American actresses